Justin Hamilton may refer to:

 Justin Hamilton (safety) (born 1982), American football safety
 Justin Hamilton (comedian), Australian comedian, writer and radio host
 Justin Hamilton (basketball, born 1990), American basketball center
 Justin Hamilton (basketball, born 1980), American basketball point guard/shooting guard
 Justin Hamilton (defensive lineman) (born 1993), American football player